"Crash! Boom! Bang!" is a song by Swedish pop music duo Roxette, released in May 1994 as the second single from their fifth studio album, Crash! Boom! Bang! (1994). It became a moderate hit in several European countries, peaking in the top 20 in Austria, Belgium, Finland and Sweden. The song spent over five months on the German Singles Chart, peaking at number 31. Its accompanying music video, directed by Michael Geoghegan, had to be filmed twice before release, due to technical issues.

Critical reception
AllMusic editor Bryan Buss described the song as "tender", complimenting it as "one of the best ballads they've recorded". Larry Flick from Billboard wrote that "given the song's title, you might expect a pop/rocker. However, Swedish duo goes in the opposite musical direction, opting for a twangy, quasi-psychedelic ballad." He also felt that frontwoman Marie Fredriksson "has developed into an impressive singer, rising above a buzzing stew of sitars and strings with ease." Chuck Campbell from Knoxville News Sentinel commented, "Despite its name, "Crash! Boom! Bang!" is an easy listen (though an overlong one) as Gessle's fine pop sensibilites guide the twosome over the smooth terrain of catchy hooks and polished ballads. Fredriksson's sweet vocals are the fuel." 

In his weekly UK chart commentary, James Masterton said, "Roxette have made some gorgeous ballads in the past but this one drifts by without ever grabbing the attention and so seems destined to become one of their smaller hits." Pan-European magazine Music & Media wrote, "Sometimes the vocabulary used is a bit confusing. Despite the cartoon-esque words, the title track of the new CD is everything but an earth-shattering rocker. Forget it, it's a classy ballad!" Alan Jones from Music Week gave it four out of five, naming it as "one of Roxette's gentler songs, a slowly building ballad similar to some of Heart's hits. A grower rather than an instant hit, but likely to prove bigger than "Sleeping in My Car"." A reviewer from People Magazine complimented Fredriksson's vocals on the song as "subtle and graceful". Mark Sutherland from Smash Hits called it a "soppy" ballad and "a lovely title track for the weeds."

Music video
Irish filmmaker Michael Geoghegan, who would go on to direct a total of four music videos for the duo, directed the song's accompanying video, which was inspired by the work of Polish director Zbigniew Rybczyński, and consists of one continuous shot of Marie Fredriksson ascending a never-ending circular staircase. Per Gessle commented that the video had to be recorded twice due to technical issues: "The first version turned out to have technical problems with the audio sync. We had to re-shoot the entire video! The director, Michael, and the insurance company almost had heart attacks. We had to start all over again. No big deal. We regarded [the first version] as a £250,000 rehearsal. Ah, the music biz in those days." The music video was A-listed on Germany's VIVA in July 1994.

Formats and track listings
All songs were written by Per Gessle.

 7-inch single and cassette (Australia 8650847 · Europe 8650844 · UK TCEM324 · US 4KM-58240)
 "Crash! Boom! Bang!" (Radio Edit) – 4:25
 "Joyride" (Unplugged Version) – 5:35

 CD single (Australia · Europe 8650852)
 "Crash! Boom! Bang!" – 4:25
 "Joyride" (Unplugged Version) – 5:35
 "Run to You" (Demo, December 1992) – 3:45

 UK CD1 (CDEMS324)
 "Crash! Boom! Bang!" – 5:02
 "Joyride" (7" Version) – 3:59
 "The Look" – 3:56

 UK CD2 (CDEM324)
 "Crash! Boom! Bang!" – 4:25
 "Joyride" (Unplugged Version) – 5:35
 "Run to You" (Demo) – 3:45
 "It Must Have Been Love" – 4:18

Personnel
Personnel are adapted from the liner notes of Don't Bore Us, Get to the Chorus!
 Marie Fredriksson – lead and background vocals
 Per Gessle – mixing
 Per "Pelle" Alsing – drums
 Christer Jansson – percussion
 Jonas Isacsson – acoustic and electric guitars
 Anders Herrlin – bass guitar, programming and engineering
 Mats Holmquist – string arrangement and conducting
 Clarence Öfwerman – keyboards, programming, string arrangement, production and mixing
 Alar Suurna – engineering and mixing
 Stockholms Nya Kammarorkester  – orchestration

Charts

Weekly charts

Year-end charts

Release history

References

1994 singles
1994 songs
EMI Records singles
Music videos directed by Michael Geoghegan
Roxette songs
Songs written by Per Gessle